Allantinae is a subfamily of sawflies in the family Tenthredinidae, and the largest subfamily of that family, with about 110 genera. The subfamily is considered to consist of five to six tribes, and are medium to large sawflies.

Economic importance 
Host plants include strawberries, raspberries, roses, violets, dogwood, and loosestrife. Larvae often pupate in fruit or wood.

Monostegia abdominalis has larvae that feed on Primulaceae, and was introduced into Canada in about 1965 and is a major pest of Yellow Loosestrife (Lysimachia terrestris).

Taxonomy
Tribes (type genera) select genera;
 Adamasini (Adamas Malaise, 1945)
 Allantini Rohwer, 1911 (Allantus Panzer 1801) Emphytopsis Wie & Nie, 1998
 Athaliini
 Caliroini Benson, 1938 (Caliroa Costa, 1859)
 Empriini Rohwer, 1911 (Empria Lepeletier & Serville 1828) Monostegia Costa, 1859
 Eriocampini Rohwer, 1911 (Eriocampa Hartig 1837)

References

Bibliography

Further reading

External links 

 Bugguide: Allantinae

Tenthredinidae